Aagot Børseth (29 November 1898 – 19  December 1993) was a Norwegian actress.

Biography
Aagot Tangen was born in Kristiania (now Oslo), Norway. She made her debut at Rogaland Teater in Stavanger during 1918 as Grete in  Faddergaven by Peter Egge (1869-1959). Later she came to Chat Noir, where she noted herself as the street girl Gusti in Flammen. She came to the Nationaltheatret in 1928  and  performed there for 40 years. She made her film debut in  Felix (1921)  and participated in numerous Norwegian films including    Frestelse (1940) and Selkvinnen (1953). She was also a widely used actor on Radioteatret and on television.
 
She was married to Henrik Børseth (1885–1970), who was also an actor at the Nationaltheatret. She died in 1993 and was buried at Vestre gravlund in Oslo.

Filmography
Fru Inger til Østråt (1975)  
Eiszeit (1975) (TV) 
Bernardas hus (1964) (TV) 
Sønner av Norge kjøper bil (1962) 
Sønner av Norge (1961) 
Støv på hjernen (1959)  
Selkvinnen (1953)  
Frestelse (1940)  
Felix (1921)

References

External links 

1898 births
1993 deaths
Actresses from Oslo
Norwegian stage actresses
Norwegian film actresses
Norwegian silent film actresses
Burials at Vestre gravlund
20th-century Norwegian actresses